Hızardere can refer to:

 Hızardere, Çilimli
 Hızardere, Horasan